"You Bring Me Joy" is a song by American singer-songwriter Mary J. Blige. It was written by Blige, Sean "Puffy" Combs, Joel "Jo-Jo" Hailey, and Chucky Thompson for her second studio album, My Life (1994), while overall music production was helmed by Combs and Thompson with the vocal tracks being produced by Jo-Jo. The song is built around a sample of "It's Ecstasy When You Lay Down Next to Me" (1977) by singer Barry White. Due to the inclusion of the sample, Ekundayo Paris and Nelson Pigford are also credited as songwriters. "You Bring Me Joy" served as the third single from My Life and peaked at number 29 on the US Hot R&B/Hip-Hop Songs, also topping the Hot Dance Club Songs.

Critical reception
Steve Baltin from Cash Box wrote, "Without achieving the notoriety of a Boyz II Men or Whitney Houston, Blige has quickly become one of the surest bets on both the pop and r&b singles charts, currently appearing twice on each chart. The latest single from her My Life album is sure to follow suit rapidly. Featuring a solid beat to accompnay Blige’s sweet vocals, the track is a natural at a plethora of formats." Jonathan Bernstein from Spin noted, "The same piano intro that gave "Real Love" its irresistible bounce reappears to serve the same purpose in "You Bring Me Joy"."

Music video
The accompanying music video for "You Bring Me Joy" was directed by Marcus Raboy. It was shot at a big blue and red room from April 10–11, 1995 where Blige and other dancers do crazy dance moves. The video was later published on Blige's official YouTube channel in December 2019, and had generated more than 1.3 million views as of January 2023.

Credits and personnel
Credits adapted from the My Life liner notes.

Mary J. Blige – lead vocals
LaTonya J. Blige – background vocals
Joel "Jo-Jo" Hailey – background vocals 
Chucky Thompson – additional instruments 
Bassy Bob Brockman – music programming, recording engineer, mixing 
Nashiem Myrick – music programming, recording engineer

Charts

Weekly charts

Year-end charts

References

1995 singles
Mary J. Blige songs
Music videos directed by Marcus Raboy
Songs written by Mary J. Blige
Songs written by Sean Combs
1994 songs
Uptown Records singles
Songs written by Chucky Thompson